Ryan William Thang (born May 11, 1987) is an American professional ice hockey player. He was selected by the Nashville Predators in the 3rd round (81st overall) of the 2007 NHL Entry Draft. Thang was born in Chicago, and was a 3-year member and Senior captain of the Edina High School Hockey Team.

Playing career
Thang played four seasons (2006–10) of college ice hockey at the University of Notre Dame with the Notre Dame Fighting Irish in the CCHA at the NCAA Division I level.

Thang was honored for his outstanding college play when he was named to the CCHA All-Rookie Team in his freshman year.

After signing a two-year entry level contract with the Predators, Thang played each season primarily with AHL affiliate, the Milwaukee Admirals. In the 2011–12 season, Thang made his one-time NHL debut for the Predators in a 5–4 defeat against the Chicago Blackhawks on October 31, 2011.

On June 15, 2012, Thang signed his first European contract on a one-year deal with Augsburger Panther of the Deutsche Eishockey Liga for the 2012–13 season. During the year with the Panthers, Thang contributed 14 goals for 29 points in 50 games.

On June 20, 2013, Thang moved to Sweden, and signed a one-year contract with second division club, Mora IK.

Career statistics

Awards and honours

References

External links

1987 births
Living people
Augsburger Panther players
HIFK (ice hockey) players
Ice hockey players from Minnesota
Sportspeople from Edina, Minnesota
Ice hockey people from Chicago
Milwaukee Admirals players
Nashville Predators draft picks
Nashville Predators players
Notre Dame Fighting Irish men's ice hockey players
Omaha Lancers players
Sioux Falls Stampede players
American expatriate ice hockey players in Germany
American expatriate ice hockey players in Sweden
American expatriate ice hockey players in Finland
American expatriate ice hockey players in South Korea
High1 players
American men's ice hockey left wingers